is a Japanese track and field athlete who specialises in the long jump. She competed in the women's long jump at the 2016 Summer Olympics held in Rio de Janeiro, Brazil.

Personal bests

Outdoor

International competition

National titles
Japanese Championships
Long jump: 2016

References

External links 
 
 
 
 

1993 births
Living people
Sportspeople from Saitama Prefecture
Japanese female long jumpers
Olympic female long jumpers
Olympic athletes of Japan
Athletes (track and field) at the 2016 Summer Olympics
Japan Championships in Athletics winners
21st-century Japanese women